In the United States Army, Marine Corps, Air Force and Space Force, lieutenant colonel is a field-grade officer rank, just above the rank of major and just below the rank of colonel. It is equivalent to the naval rank of commander in the other uniformed services.

The pay grade for the rank of lieutenant colonel is O-5. In the United States armed forces, the insignia for the rank are a silver oak leaf, with slight stylized differences between the version of the Army and the Air Force and that of the Navy and the Marine Corps.

Promotion to lieutenant colonel is governed by Department of Defense policies derived from the Defense Officer Personnel Management Act (DOPMA) of 1980, for officers in the Active Component, and its companion Reserve Officer Personnel Management Act (ROPMA), for officers in the Reserve Component (e.g., Reserve and National Guard). DOPMA guidelines suggest that 70 percent of majors be promoted to lieutenant colonel after serving at least three years at their present rank and after 15–17 years of cumulative commissioned service.

Orthography
The U.S. Army uses the three letter abbreviation "LTC," while the Marine Corps and Air Force use the abbreviations of "LtCol" and "Lt Col" (note the space), respectively.  These abbreviation formats are also outlined in The Naval Institute Guide to Naval Writing and in Air Force Handbook 33-337 (AFH 33-337), The Tongue and Quill.

The United States Government Publishing Office recommends the abbreviation "LTC" for U.S. Army usage, "LtCol" for Marine Corps usage, and "Lt. Col." for the Air Force. The Associated Press Stylebook recommends the abbreviation "Lt. Col." for the Army, Marine Corps, and Air Force.

Slang terms for the rank historically used by the U.S. military include "light colonel", "short colonel", "light bird", "half colonel", "walking colonel", "bottlecap colonel" (referring to the silver oak leaf insignia), and "telephone colonel" (from self-reference as "colonel" when using a telephone).

History  

The rank of lieutenant colonel has existed in the British Army since at least the 16th century and was used in both American colonial militia and colonial regular regiments. The Continental Army continued the British and colonial use of the rank of lieutenant colonel, as the second-in-command to a colonel commanding a regiment. The lieutenant colonel was sometimes known as "lieutenant to the colonel."

In British practice, regiments were commanded by their lieutenant colonels, as the colonel was a titular position (with the incumbent absent from the regiment serving as a senior staff officer, a general officer, or as a member of the nobility). Since the British colonel was not a "combat" officer, beginning in May 1778 to simplify prisoner-of-war exchanges, American regiments began to eliminate colonels by attrition and replace them with lieutenant colonel commandant. The conversion was never completely effected and some regiments remained commanded by colonels throughout the war. From 1784 until 1791, there was only one lieutenant colonel in the U.S. Army (Josiah Harmar), who acted as the army's commanding officer.

In the Continental Army aides to the Commander in Chief, viz., Lieutenant General George Washington, were lieutenant colonels. Additionally, certain officers serving under the Adjutant General, Inspector General, and Judge Advocate General, ranked as lieutenant colonels.

During the 19th century, lieutenant colonel was often a terminal rank for many officers, since the rank of "full colonel" was considered extremely prestigious and reserved only for the most successful officers. Upon the outbreak of the Civil War, the rank of lieutenant colonel became much more common and was used as a "stepping stone" for officers who commanded small regiments or battalions and were expected, by default, to be promoted to full colonel once the manpower of a regiment grew in strength. Such was the case of Joshua Lawrence Chamberlain, who commanded a Maine regiment as both a lieutenant colonel and later as a colonel.

After the Civil War ended, those officers remaining in the military found lieutenant colonel to again be a terminal rank, although many lieutenant colonels were raised to higher positions in a brevet status. Such was the case with George A. Custer, who was a lieutenant colonel in the regular army, but held the brevet rank of major general.

The 20th century saw lieutenant colonel in its present-day status although, during the 1930s, many officers again found the rank to be terminal as the rank of colonel was reserved for only a select few officers.

Modern usage 

In the United States Army and the United States Marine Corps (USMC), a lieutenant colonel typically commands a battalion- or squadron-sized unit (300 to 1,200 Soldiers or Marines), with a major as executive officer (XO) and a command sergeant major or sergeant major (USMC) as principal non-commissioned officer (NCO) or senior enlisted adviser (SEA). A lieutenant colonel may also serve as a brigade/brigade combat team, regiment/regimental combat team, Marine Aviation Group (MAG), Marine Expeditionary Unit (MEU), or battalion task force executive officer. Lieutenant colonels routinely serve as principal staff officers, under a colonel as chief of staff, on a general staff ("G" staff) of a division, Marine Expeditionary Brigade (MEB), Marine Aircraft Wing (MAW), or Marine Logistics Group (MLG). These staff positions include G-1 (administration and personnel), G-2 (intelligence), G-3 (operations), G-4 (logistics), G-5 (planning), G-6 (computers and communications), and G-9 (Civil Affairs). "The G-n" may mean either a specific staff section or the staff officer leading a section. Lieutenant colonels may also be junior staff at a variety of higher echelons.

In the United States Air Force, a lieutenant colonel is generally a squadron commander in the operations group, mission support group, maintenance group, or squadron commander or division chief in a medical group. The lieutenant colonel also may serve as a Director of Operations (DO) in a squadron in the operations group before assuming command of his or her own squadron (this is common for rated officers in flying units), or as a deputy commander of a squadron in the maintenance, mission-support, or medical group. Lieutenant colonels may serve also on general staff and may be the heads of some wing staff departments. Air Force lieutenant colonels in the acquisition career fields can be selected to serve as "Materiel Leaders" (Program Managers or Branch Chiefs), similar to how other Air Force lieutenant colonels are selected to serve as squadron commanders. Senior lieutenant colonels occasionally serve as group commanders, most commonly in units of the Air Force Reserve Command and the Air National Guard.

In U.S. Army ROTC detachments, the commander is typically a lieutenant colonel, with several majors, captains, and non-commissioned officers serving as assistants.  In the U.S. Air Force, Air Force ROTC detachments may be commanded by full colonels or lieutenant colonels, depending on the size of the detachment and the size of the associated college or university.

Insignia

Notable American lieutenant colonels 

 Eben Bartlett (U.S. Army), member of the New Hampshire House of Representatives
 Aaron Burr (Continental Army)
 Benjamin Busch (U.S. Marine Corps), TV and film actor
 James Pratt Carter (U.S. Army)
 Ernest Childers (U.S. Army), Medal of Honor recipient
 Jerry Coleman (U.S. Marine Corps)
 Robert G. Cole (U.S. Army), Medal of Honor recipient
 David P. Cooley (U.S. Air Force)
 Philip Corso (U.S. Army)
 Bruce P. "Snake" Crandall (U.S. Army), Medal of Honor recipient for his actions at Ia Drang.
 George Armstrong Custer (U.S. Army)
 James Harold "Jimmy" Doolittle (U.S. Air Force), Medal of Honor recipient for his raid on Tokyo
 Tammy Duckworth (U.S. Army), U.S. Senator (D-Illinois)
 Joni Ernst (Iowa Army National Guard), U.S. Senator (R-Iowa)
 William Montague Ferry Jr. (U.S. Army)
 Rick Francona (U.S. Air Force)
 John C. Fremont (U.S. Army)
 Tulsi Gabbard (U.S. Army), former U.S. Representative from Hawaii.
 Gregory D. Gadson (U.S. Army)
 Virgil I. "Gus" Grissom (U.S. Air Force)
 Dave Grossman (U.S. Army), professor of psychology and military science, author, and speaker
 David "Bull" Gurfein (U.S. Marine Corps)
 Iceal Hambleton (U.S. Air Force)
 Alexander Hamilton (Continental Army)
 Anthony B. Herbert (U.S. Army)
 Christopher B. Howard (U.S. Air Force)
 Lisa Jaster (U.S. Army), first female USAR officer to become a Ranger School graduate.
 Shawna R. Kimbrell (U.S. Air Force), the first female African-American fighter pilot
 Gus Kohntopp (U.S. Air National Guard)
 John Laurens (Continental Army)
 Bruce R. McConkie (U.S. Army), apostle, The Church of Jesus Christ of Latter-day Saints
 Bob McDonnell (U.S. Army), former Republican Attorney General and Governor of Virginia.
 Amy McGrath (U.S. Marine Corps), political candidate, first female pilot to fly the F/A-18 on a combat mission
 Hal Moore (U.S. Army), famous for his actions at Ia Drang
 Michael Mori (U.S. Marine Corps), lawyer and military judge (retired), known for representing David Hicks
 Dick Muri (U.S. Air Force)
 Oliver North (U.S. Marine Corps)
 Ellison S. Onizuka (U.S. Air Force)
 Ralph Peters (U.S. Army)
 Rob Riggle (U.S. Marine Corps)
 William R. Rowley (U.S. Army)
 Stuart Scheller (U.S. Marine Corps)
 Richard Scheuring (U.S. Army)
 Francis R. Scobee (U.S. Air Force)
 John Shimkus (U.S. Army), U.S. Representative from Illinois
 Ronald Speirs (U.S. Army)
 Michael Strobl (U.S. Marine Corps)
 Tench Tilghman (Continental Army)
 William Travis (Texas Militia)
 Matt Urban (U.S. Army)
 John Paul Vann (U.S. Army)
 Alexander Vindman (U.S. Army)
 Allen West (U.S. Army), former U.S. Representative from Florida
 Ed White (U.S. Air Force)
 Earl Woods (U.S. Army)

References

Military ranks of the United States Army
Military ranks of the United States Marine Corps
Officer ranks of the United States Air Force
Officer ranks of the United States Space Force